The United States Coast Guard Academy's intercollegiate sports teams are called the Bears.  They compete in NCAA Division III as members of the New England Women's and Men's Athletic Conference. Through the 2016 season, the Bears played football in the New England Football Conference, but after that season moved their football program into the NEWMAC, which started sponsoring the sport in 2017.

The school fields 26 varsity teams.

Origin of the name 
The academy nickname is the Bears, after the USRC Bear, which made a dramatic rescue in Alaska in 1897, shortly after the opening of the academy.

In 1926, then-Cadet Stephen Evans (a future superintendent of the academy) brought a live bear to the academy and named it Objee for "Objectionable Presence." The tradition of keeping a live bear as the mascot was continued until the City of New London petitioned for its removal in 1984.

Facilities 
The athletic facilities have been undergoing major upgrades since 2004, when the state-of-the-art FieldTurf synthetic surface was installed at Cadet Memorial Field (home of the football and lacrosse teams).

In 2019, a new field design and scoreboard were installed on Cadet Memorial Field.

Rivalries 
The Bears have an unofficial rivalry with neighboring Connecticut College. The rivalry is most evident during the Coast Guard–Connecticut College biannual club hockey game which draws large numbers of spectators from both schools.

The Bears also play for the Secretaries Cup, an annual rivalry trophy in football against the Mariners of the United States Merchant Marine Academy.

The Bears' longest-standing football rivalry game is with the Norwich University Cadets, a private military college in Vermont. Since 1931, the schools have played for "The Mug," with a break in the series having taken place between 2005 and 2017.

Varsity teams

Sailing 
The academy boasts a strong sailing tradition and maintains a fleet of over 150 vessels to support the offshore and dinghy teams, in addition to the summer sail training programs.

In 2007, a USCGA cadet, then a freshman sailor from the class of 2011, Krysta Rohde, was featured in the "Faces in the Crowd" section of the 27 December edition of Sports Illustrated. That year Rohde gained recognition by being the first academy cadet and second freshman ever to win the ICSA Women's Singlehanded National Championship.

In 2016, the Bears would win the Sperry Women's National Championship, the schools first team championship in the sport.

Football 
The 1951 team under head coach Nels Nitchman was the first undefeated team at the Coast Guard Academy. They won six games and tied Northeastern University who also was undefeated. In 1963, the Coast Guard Academy's football team had a perfect season, making it eligible for that year's Tangerine Bowl.

Otto Graham, the Pro Football Hall of Famer, was head coach and then athletic director at Coast Guard from 1959 to 1985.  His service was interrupted by his three seasons (1966-68) as Head Coach and General Manager of the Washington Redskins, who then replaced him with Vince Lombardi.

Club sports 
The Coast Guard Academy has many club sports such as men's and women's rugby, water polo, men's ice hockey and triathlon. The Academy's boxing team was disbanded in 2018 due to safety concerns.

Rugby 
In 2006, the men's rugby club won the Division II National Championship at Stanford, California, after defeating the University of Northern Colorado.

Men's Water Polo 
In 2008, the men's water polo team took fourth place at the Collegiate Water Polo Association Division III Club Championships at Villanova University. Additionally, the squad captured the North Atlantic Crown to snag its inaugural postseason berth.

In 2012, the team made it into the field as the North Atlantic Division runner-up. In the same year, the Bears won sixth at Middlebury College in the Collegiate Water Polo Association Division III Club Championships.

In 2017, the team finished seventh in the nation at the Collegiate Water Polo Association Division III Club Championships after ending their season with an 11–1 record. In that season, the Bears held most of their practices in the Thames River due to a shortage of pool space at the Academy.

In 2018, the team placed fifth in the nation at the Collegiate Water Polo Association Division III Club Championships at Wesleyan University after winning the Colonial Division Championships with a 12–0 record.

In 2019, the team set multiple club records. First, the team finished third in the nation at the Collegiate Water Polo Association Division III Club Championships at Villanova University, their best finish in club history. Additionally, the Bears won the Colonial Division Championships after a record-breaking 13–0 regular season record.

In 2021, the team placed first in the Colonial Division in a short 4 game season. They would finish undefeated at 4–0.

References

External links